The Mulrien House is located on Montgomery Street in Poughkeepsie, New York, United States. It was built in 1862 and is a -story, Gothic Revival–style dwelling with a steeply pitched, slate-covered cross-gable roof. It features curved and cut-out bargeboard with ornamentation and a small balcony over the front door.

It was added to the National Register of Historic Places in 1982.

See also

National Register of Historic Places listings in Poughkeepsie, New York

References

Houses on the National Register of Historic Places in New York (state)
Gothic Revival architecture in New York (state)
Houses completed in 1862
Houses in Poughkeepsie, New York
1862 establishments in New York (state)
National Register of Historic Places in Poughkeepsie, New York